Markus Strömbergsson (born 26 April 1975) is a Swedish football referee. Strömbergsson currently resides in Gävle.  He was a full international referee for FIFA between 2006 and 2012. He became a professional referee in 1996 and has been an Allsvenskan referee since 2003. Strömbergsson has refereed 147 matches in Allsvenskan, 63 matches in Superettan and 47 international matches as of 2013. He is the brother of Martin Strömbergsson.

See also 

 List of football referees

References

External links 
FIFA
SvFF

1975 births
Living people
Swedish football referees